General Barlow may refer to:

Francis C. Barlow (1834–1896), Union Army brevet major general 
John W. Barlow (1838–1914), U.S. Army brigadier general

See also
Attorney General Barlow (disambiguation)